YOHO Town is one of the largest private housing estates and shopping centres in Yuen Long, New Territories, Hong Kong. It was developed by Sun Hung Kai Properties.

Private housing
YOHO Town is divided into four phases. 

Phase 1 "Yoho Town" has 2,200 residential units in eight blocks built in 2004. 

Phase 2 "Yoho Midtown" was completed in 2010,  and consists of eight residential buildings and a commercial shopping centre, YOHO Mall, opened in September 2015. 

Phase 3 "Grand Yoho", was partially completed in June 2017 and consists of clubhouse and a commercial shopping centre YOHO Mall extension opened in July 2017. It is meant to have nine residential blocks, but only seven have been completed. Construction of one part of the development was suspended after the discovery of excessive settlement of two nearby viaduct columns supporting the adjacent West Rail line.

Phase 4 is still under construction.

Shopping centre 

YOHO Mall consists of three parts: YOHO mall 1, YOHO mall 2 and YOHO mall 1 extension. The total commercial area is about 1.1 million square feet.

See also 

 Gated community

References

External links

Residential buildings completed in 2004
Residential buildings completed in 2010
Yuen Long District
Private housing estates in Hong Kong
Shopping centres in Hong Kong
Sun Hung Kai Properties